The 1271 siege of Tripoli was initiated by the Mamluk ruler Baibars against the Frankish ruler of the Principality of Antioch and the County of Tripoli, Bohemond VI.  It followed the dramatic fall of Antioch in 1268, and was an attempt by the Mamluks to completely destroy the Crusader states of Antioch and Tripoli.

Background
In the mid-13th century, the Crusaders had been steadily losing ground and were being squeezed between the advancing troops of the Egyptian Mamluks from the south, and the advancing Mongol Empire from the east, with insufficient assistance arriving from Europe in the West. Around 1260, Bohemond VI, under the influence of his father-in-law, King Hethum I of Armenia, had submitted Antioch and Tripoli to the Mongol Empire, making them vassal states which contributed troops to the Mongol forces, in their battles against the Muslims.  The Mongols made dramatic victories in Persia and Syria, effectively destroying the Abbasid and Ayyubid Caliphates, and causing a shift of Islamic power to the Egyptian Mamluks in Cairo.  However, before the Mongols could continue their advance southwards through Palestine towards Egypt, a succession crisis resulted in the withdrawal of the majority of their troops, as the Mongol princes convened on Karakorum to decide on a new Great Khan. A smaller force was left to occupy Syria and engage in raids through Palestine. Still, the Crusaders and the Mamluks engaged in a truce, which allowed the Mamluks to advance northwards through Crusader territory, and engage the weakened Mongol force at the Battle of Ayn Jalut in 1260.  When the bulk of the Mongol forces returned in 1262, they were never able to avenge the loss.  Meanwhile, the Mamluks proceeded to reclaim the remaining Levant from Crusader's hands.  Jerusalem had been taken in 1244 by the Khwarazmians, and the Egyptian Mamluks worked their way northward, capturing castle after castle.

In 1268, the Egyptian Mamluks besieged and captured Antioch, leaving Bohemond with only Tripoli.  Baibars next turned his sights on Tripoli, and sent a letter to Bohemond threatening him with total annihilation, and taunting him for his alliance with the Mongol ruler Abaqa:

Bohemond begged for a truce, so as not to lose Tripoli as well. Baibar mocked him for his lack of courage and asked him to pay all the expenses of the Mamluk campaign. Bohemond had enough pride left to refuse the offer. By this time, the Mamluks had captured every inland castle of the Franks, but the Mamluks had heard reports about the arrival of the Ninth Crusade, led by the prince who would later be Edward I of England. Edward had landed in Acre on May 9, 1271, where he was soon joined by Bohemond and his cousin King Hugh of Cyprus and Jerusalem.

Baibars, therefore, accepted Bohemond's offer of a truce in May, abandoned the siege of Tripoli, and instead concentrated his forces in Damas, in anticipation of future battles. Edward made an attempt to coordinate his own actions with the Mongols, but was not successful since the Mongols were busy with internal conflicts, and Edward's own forces were very small and fairly ineffective. He therefore opted to negotiate his own truce with the Mamluks, before returning to England.

Aftermath
The next major offensive against Tripoli was in 1289 by the Mamluk Sultan Qalawun, who successfully orchestrated the fall of Tripoli and destruction of the Crusader State.  He then made plans to capture the last major Crusader stronghold, Saint-Jean d'Acre, but died in 1290.  The fall of Acre was achieved in 1291 by Qalawun's son, Al-Ashraf Khalil.

References

René Grousset, Histoire des Croisades III

Tripoli 1271
County of Tripoli
Conflicts in 1271
13th century in the Mamluk Sultanate
Tripoli
Military history of the Crusader states after Lord Edward's crusade
History of Tripoli, Lebanon